China 3D TV Test Channel was a Chinese television channel which broadcast digital 3D television content from China Central Television, Beijing Television, Tianjin Television, Shanghai Media Group, Jiangsu Television and Shenzhen Media Group. It was launched on 1 January 2012 and was shut down on 30 July 2018, being replaced by CCTV-4K, a television channel which broadcasts 4K content solely from CCTV.

External links

Television networks in China
Chinese-language television stations
3D television channels
Television channels and stations established in 2012
Chinese companies established in 2012
Television channels and stations disestablished in 2018
Chinese companies disestablished in 2018